The Lancaster Amish affiliation is the largest affiliation among the Old Order Amish and as such a subgroup of Amish. Its origin and largest settlement is Lancaster County in Pennsylvania. The settlement in Lancaster County, founded in 1760 near Churchtown is the oldest Amish settlement that is still in existence.

Practice and belief 

Even though the Lancaster affiliation is quite liberal concerning the use of technology compared to other Amish affiliations (see table below), it is an affiliation that practices strenge Meidung (strict shunning). Lancaster affiliation buggies have gray tops.

Settlements and districts 

Lancaster affiliation had 141 church districts in 1991 and 286 in 2010. In 2011 it was present in eight states in 37 settlements with 291 church districts. It represents about 15 percent of the Old Order Amish population, that is about 45,000 out of about 300,000 in 2015.

References

Literature 
 Donald B. Kraybill, Karen M. Johnson-Weiner and Steven M. Nolt: The Amish, Johns Hopkins University Press, Baltimore MD 2013. 
 Charles Hurst and David McConnell: An Amish Paradox. Diversity and Change in the World's Largest Amish Community,  Johns Hopkins University Press, Baltimore MD 2010 
 Steven Nolt and Thomas J. Meyers: Plain Diversity: Amish Cultures and Identities, Baltimore MD 2007. 
 Donald B. Kraybill: The Riddle of Amish Culture, Baltimore MD 2002. 

Old Order Amish